The Albia Community School District is a rural public school district headquartered in Albia, Iowa.

It serves areas in Monroe and Appanoose counties, including Albia, Lovilia, and Melrose.

It operates Kendall Center, Grant Center, Lincoln Center, Albia Middle School and Albia High School, all located in Ablia.

After the 2008 dissolution of the Russell Community School District, the district absorbed some of the former students of the Russell district.

Schools
The district operates five schools, all located in Albia.
Grant Center (K-2nd Grade)
Kendall Center (PK)
Lincoln Center (3-6 Grade)
Albia Middle School 
Albia High School

See also
List of high schools in Iowa

References

External links
 Albia Community School District
School districts in Iowa
Education in Appanoose County, Iowa
Education in Monroe County, Iowa